Juraj Chvátal (born 13 July 1996) is a Slovak professional footballer who plays as a defender for 
Sigma Olomouc.

Club career
Chvátal started his career at TJ Slavoj Moravský Svätý Ján.
He made his professional debut for Senica against Dukla Banská Bystrica on 8 March 2014.

References

External links

Eurofotbal profile
Corgoň Liga profile

1996 births
Living people
Sportspeople from Malacky
Slovak footballers
Slovakia international footballers
Slovakia under-21 international footballers
Slovakia youth international footballers
Association football midfielders
FK Senica players
AC Sparta Prague players
1. FC Slovácko players
MŠK Žilina players
SK Sigma Olomouc players
FK Železiarne Podbrezová players
Czech First League players
Slovak Super Liga players
2. Liga (Slovakia) players
Expatriate footballers in the Czech Republic
Slovak expatriate sportspeople in the Czech Republic
Slovak expatriate footballers